The Thailand E-Sports Federation (TESF), previously known as the Thai E-Sports Association, is a Thai body established to manage e-sports in Thailand. It is recognised by the Sports Authority of Thailand and is a member of the International e-Sports Federation.

References

External links 
  

Esports governing bodies
Sports governing bodies in Thailand
Esports in Thailand
Sports organizations established in 2013
Sports organizations established in 2017